Yuryevets is a town and the administrative center of Yuryevetsky District in Ivanovo Oblast, Russia, located at the confluence of the Unzha and the Volga Rivers. Population:

History
It was founded in 1225 by Yury II as Yuryev-Povolzhsky ("Yury's town on the Volga"). In 1237, the town was destroyed by the army of Batu Khan.

Administrative and municipal status
Within the framework of administrative divisions, Yuryevets serves as the administrative center of Yuryevetsky District, to which it is directly subordinated. Prior to the adoption of the Law #145-OZ On the Administrative-Territorial Division of Ivanovo Oblast in December 2010, it used to be incorporated separately as an administrative unit with the status equal to that of the districts.

As a municipal division, the town of Yuryevets is incorporated within Yuryevetsky Municipal District as Yuryevetskoye Urban Settlement.

Notable people
The natives of Yuryevets include the Vesnin brothers. Filmmaker Andrei Tarkovsky spent his childhood years there.

References

Notes

Sources

External links
Unofficial website of Yuryevets 

Cities and towns in Ivanovo Oblast
Yuryevetsky Uyezd